The 1957 Clemson Tigers football team was an American football team that represented Clemson College in the Atlantic Coast Conference (ACC) during the 1957 NCAA University Division football season. In its 18th season under head coach Frank Howard, the team compiled a 7–3 record (4–3 against conference opponents), tied for third place in the ACC, was ranked No. 18 in the final Coaches Poll, and outscored opponents by a total of 216 to 78.  The team played its home games at Memorial Stadium in Clemson, South Carolina.

The annual "Big Thursday" game with South Carolina drew a crowd of 44,020, the largest crowd to see a football game up to that date in the State of South Carolina. Clemson played its last game against Presbyterian College; Presbyterian was Clemson's season-opening game from 1930 until 1957.

Guard John Grdijan and Leon Kaltenback were the team captains. The team's statistical leaders included quarterback Harvey White with 841 passing yards, fullback Bob Spooner with 358 rushing yards, and Spooner and halfback Bill Mathis with 30 points (five touchdowns) each.

John Grdijan and Harvey White were selected as first-team players by the 1957 All-Atlantic Coast Conference football team. Four Clemson players were also named to the 1957 All-South Carolina football team: Grdijan, White, end Ray Masneri, and center Donnie Bunton.

Schedule

References

Clemson
Clemson Tigers football seasons
Clemson Tigers football